The Recorder of Kinsale was a judicial office-holder in pre-independence Ireland. He was the chief magistrate of the town of Kinsale. Given the population of the town, which was rarely more than 7000, the need for a full-time judge may be questioned. However Kinsale has been a chartered town since 1334, and the charter granted by Elizabeth 1 in 1589 explicitly provided for the office of Recorder, as did that granted to Clonakilty by James I in 1613.  The first Recorder of Kinsale whose name is definitely known is Robert Slighe, who served in that office between approximately 1601 and 1615.<ref>"The Lord Courcy's son's passports to some of his father's followers, July 7, 1615: Warrant upon the humble suit of Robert Slighe, Recorder of Kinsale" Copy in the National Library of Ireland</ref>

Like other Irish Recorders, the Recorder of Kinsale was not a Crown appointment, but was elected by Kinsale Corporation, also known as the Court of the Hundred.

In addition to presiding at criminal trials, it seems likely that he held a weekly court of Petty session to deal with routine judicial business, as his colleague the Recorder of Clonakilty did. The Reorder was also charged with keeping the peace. Henry Bathurst, in the 1650s, was much occupied with curbing the supposed threat to public order posed by the large Quakers community in County Cork, and was accused, perhaps unfairly, of being a "great persecutor" of that denomination.

Due to the size of the town, the Recorder's duties were not especially onerous, and were often combined with another Government post. Henry Bathurst was also Recorder of Cork, and Sir Richard Cox, 1st Baronet, was also Recorder of Clonakilty from 1675: he later went on to hold high judicial office, notably as Lord Chancellor of Ireland. William Rowley, the elder brother of Admiral Sir Josias Rowley, who was Recorder from 1796 to 1812, combined that position with the office of Commissioner of Customs for Kinsale, and also sat in the Irish House of Commons as member for Kinsale.

Like all Irish Recorderships, the office was abolished by the Irish Free State in 1924.

List of Recorders of Kinsale (incomplete)
1601 Robert Slighe
1630s William Galway (died 1637)
1655 Henry Bathurst (also Recorder of Cork)
1681 Sir Richard Cox, 1st Baronet (also Recorder of Clonakilty, later Lord Chancellor of Ireland)
1796 William Rowley (also MP for Kinsale)
1832 Richard Connell

SourcesBurke's Peerage 107th Edition Delaware 2003
Fuller, Abraham and Holms, Thomas A Compendious View of Some Extraordinary Sufferings of the Quakers in Ireland 2nd Edition Dublin 1731
Lewis, Samuel A Topographical Dictionary of Ireland London S. Lewis and Co 1837
O'Hart, John Pedigrees of Ireland 5th Edition 1892Warrant issued by Robert Slighe, Recorder of Kinsale 7 July 1615''

Notes

 
Political office-holders in pre-partition Ireland
People from Kinsale